Sir Robert Monckton-Arundell, 4th Viscount Galway PC (4 July 1752 – 23 July 1810), was a British politician of the late 18th and early 19th centuries.

He was a younger son of William Monckton-Arundell, 2nd Viscount Galway and succeeded his elder brother Henry to the title in 1774.

He was elected Member of Parliament to represent Pontefract from 1780 to 1783, made a Privy Counsellor in 1784 and knighted in 1786.  He was MP for York from 1783 to 1790 and again for Pontefract from 1796 to 1802.

His career also included service as Comptroller of the Household (1784–87) during the reign of King George III.

Marriages and children
He married twice:firstly Elizabeth, the daughter of Daniel Mathew of Felix Hall, Essex, with whom he had 5 sons and 4 daughters and secondly Mary Bridget, the daughter and heiress of Pemberton Milnes of Bawtry Hall, Yorkshire and the widow of P. A. Hay Drummond. He was succeeded by his son William Monckton-Arundell, 5th Viscount Galway.

References

|-

|-

1752 births
1810 deaths
Viscounts in the Peerage of Ireland
Members of the Privy Council of Great Britain
Members of the Parliament of Great Britain for English constituencies
Members of the Parliament of the United Kingdom for English constituencies
British MPs 1780–1784
British MPs 1784–1790
British MPs 1796–1800
UK MPs 1801–1802
Galway, V4